Marcos Chacon (born 1972 in Spain) is an IFBB professional bodybuilder.

Biography

Marcos Chacón his real name is Marcos Chacón Mcwenney. He is a famous Spanish bodybuilder. He has recently left the business of his gym that he had for many years in Almuecar for an underwater aquatic business.

Titles
MR. Spain IFBB.
MR. Granada.
Marcos is a Granadaian native who went from amateur to pro, when he was discovered by Francisco del Yerro and received pro status in 2007. Chacón moved to Madrid at a young age. Mr legiónman.

Stats
Age: 45
Height: 
Weight:

Contest history

Pro
 Europa Pro-Madrid 2011, 7
 Grand prix atlantic city pro 2009, 10
 Grand Prix Rumania-Timișoara 2008, 7
 Open Atlantic City-New Jersey 2008, 7
 Open Atlantic City Master-New Jersey 2008, 5
 Open Tampa Grand Prix-Florida 2008, 9
 Grand Prix Santa Susana-España 2006, 8

Amateur
 Campeónato de Granada 1987, 2.
 winner of Andalucia Jr 1988
 Winner of Andalucia weight 1991
 Olimpia Spain winner weight 1991
 Campeonato Andalucia 1995 winner weigh and overall.
 Olympia Spanish weigh 1995, 3
 Campeón Pesos Pesados Olympia Nacional 1996
 Villa de Madrid 1997 winner
 Open Santander 1997 winner.
 Campeonato of Spain weigh IFBB 1997, winner.
 Open Nacional Eusebio Esteban 2002, 2.
 Campeonato of Spain AEF weigh 2003, winner.
 Open Costa Del Sol Absoluto 2003, 2.
 Mr Universo Talla Baja Nabaa-Alemania 2003
 Open Nacional Ulises Navarro 2005,winners overall.
 Campeonato of Spain weigh 2005,winners.
 Open Fitform 2005 winner overall.

He was a campetitions:
World Championships 2002
New York Pro Show IFBB 2006
Ironman Pro IFBB 2006,
Arnold Classic, Pro IFBB 2007,
New York Pro Show IFBB 2007,
Mr Olympia 2007,
Mr. Olympia 2008,

See also
List of male professional bodybuilders
List of female professional bodybuilders

References

marcoschacon.com

1972 births
Living people
Sportspeople from Granada
Professional bodybuilders
Spanish people of Irish descent